Halabi may refer to:

Halabi (surname), including a list of people with the name
Halabi, Iran, a village
from Aleppo in Syria
Halabi Jews
Halbi, an Indic language

See also
Alabi (surname)
 Helebi, a dialect of Domari language